Mariya Russell (c. 1989) is an American chef and restaurateur. She became the first black woman to be awarded a Michelin star in September 2019 while working as a chef at Kumik and Kikkō.  Her work contributed to Kumiko winning the Best New Restaurant award from Food & Wine magazine in 2019. Her Chicago restaurant, Kumiko, features omakase cuisine.

She grew up in Springfield, Ohio with her parents and four sisters. She moved to Columbus, Ohio for high school where she participated in a career academy that first introduced her to the idea of becoming a chef. After high school, she moved to Chicago and studied at The Cooking and Hospitality Institute of Chicago where she graduated in 2008.

Career 
While in Chicago, Mariya Russell worked at Uncommon Ground, Green Zebra, The Bristol, Nellcote, and Senza. It was at Green Zebra that she met Cara Sandoval and Noah Sandoval who would later invite her to be part of Kumiko and Kikkō. She moved to Charleston, South Carolina with her husband, chef Garrett Russell, and stayed for three years. They returned to Chicago in 2016 after her father's death and several experiences of racism. She took a job as a server at Oriole in July 2016 where she went on to become sous-chef and chef de cuisine in 2018. While working at Oriole, Noah Sandoval tapped Russell to head the omakase Kumiko. It was while she worked at Kumiko and Kikkō that she was awarded a Michelin star in September 2019 days before her 30th birthday. Shortly after that, she announced on Instagram that she was taking a break to prioritize her well-being; “I wasn’t really able to take care of myself on a day-to-day basis; the job was all I was able to fit into my life at the time…I just wanted to do more for myself and better for myself.” She moved to Hawaii in August 2020 for a break.

References 

American women restaurateurs
American restaurateurs
Living people
People from Chicago
African-American chefs
American women chefs
Chefs from Illinois
People from Springfield, Ohio
Chefs from Ohio
Year of birth missing (living people)
21st-century African-American people
21st-century African-American women